The 1998 NCAA Division I Men's Golf Championships were contested at the 60th annual NCAA-sanctioned golf tournament for determining the individual and team national champions of men's collegiate golf at the Division I level in the United States.

The tournament was held at the University of New Mexico Golf Course in Albuquerque, New Mexico.

UNLV won the team championship, the Rebels' first NCAA title.

James McLean, from Minnesota, won the individual title.

Qualifying
Three regional qualifying tournaments were held, with the top ten teams qualifying for the national championship from each event.

Individual results

Individual champion
 James McLean, Minnesota (271)

Team results

Finalists

Eliminated after 36 holes

DC = Defending champions
Debut appearance

References

NCAA Men's Golf Championship
Golf in New Mexico
NCAA Golf Championship
NCAA Golf Championship
NCAA Golf Championship